Peter Wasserscheid (born 23 October 1970, in Würzburg) is a German chemist and professor for chemical reaction engineering at the University of Erlangen-Nuremberg. Together with Matthias Beller he won the Gottfried Wilhelm Leibniz Prize in 2006.

Personal background 
Wasserscheid studied chemistry at the RWTH Aachen from 1991 to 1995 before he did his doctorate in the work group of Professor Wilhelm Keim. After postdoctoral research at BP in Great Britain he habilitated at the RWTH Aachen. Since October 2003, Wasserscheid holds the chair of Chemical engineering at the University of Erlangen-Nuremberg.

Wasserscheid is also a founder member of the company Solvent Innovation GmbH and Scientific Supervisor in this company since 2001.

Wasserscheid is married and has 3 children.

Work 
The focus of Wasserscheids work is ionic liquids where he is a pioneer, particularly in the region of developing halogenfree ionic liquids.

Awards 
1996: Friedrich-Wilhelm-Preis of the RWTH Aachen for the diploma thesis
1999: Borchers-Plakette of the RWTH Aachen for the dissertation
2000: Carl-Zerbe-Preis
2001: DECHEMA-Preis of the Max-Buchner-Forschungsstiftung
2003: Innovationspreis der Deutschen Wirtschaft
2006: Gottfried Wilhelm Leibniz Prize

External links
Homepage

References
 
 CV Wasserscheid

1970 births
Living people
Scientists from Würzburg
21st-century German chemists
Academic staff of the University of Erlangen-Nuremberg
RWTH Aachen University alumni
Gottfried Wilhelm Leibniz Prize winners